St. Johns—Iberville was a federal electoral district in Quebec, Canada, that was represented in the House of Commons of Canada from 1896 to 1935.

This riding was created in 1892 from Iberville and St. John's ridings. It consisted of the towns of St. John's and Iberville, and the parishes of St. Jean L'Evangéliste, St. Luc, Ste. Marguerite de Blairfindie (L'Acadie), St. Alexandre, Ste. Anne de Sabrevois, St. Athanase, Ste. Brigide, St. George de Henriville, St. Grégoire le Grand, St. Sébastien, St. Valentin, Notre-Dame de Stanbridge and Notre-Dame des Anges de Stanbridge, together with the islands situated in the river Richelieu opposite the parishes forming part of the said electoral district. In 1903, the parish of Lacolle and the islands in the river Richelieu opposite were transferred from the electoral district of Missisquoi to the electoral district of St. John's and Iberville.

In 1924, it was defined to consist of the Counties of St. Johns and Iberville, including the City of St. Johns.

It was abolished in 1933 when it was redistributed into Châteauguay—Huntingdon and St. Johns—Iberville—Napierville ridings.

Members of Parliament

This riding elected the following Members of Parliament:

Election results

By-election On Mr. Béchard being summoned to the Senate, 17 July 1896

By-election On Mr. Demers being appointed Puisne Judge, Superior Court
of Quebec, 31 August 1906

By-election On Mr. Demer's acceptance of an office of emolument under the Crown, 22 July 1922

See also 

 List of Canadian federal electoral districts
 Past Canadian electoral districts

External links 
 Riding history from the Library of Parliament

Former federal electoral districts of Quebec